National Tertiary Route 702, or just Route 702 (or ) is a National Road Route of Costa Rica, located in the Alajuela province.

Description
In Alajuela province the route covers San Ramón canton (San Ramón, Piedades Norte, Los Ángeles, Peñas Blancas, San Lorenzo districts), San Carlos canton (La Fortuna, La Tigra districts).

References

Highways in Costa Rica